Jatne  is a village in the administrative district of Gmina Celestynów, within Otwock County, Masovian Voivodeship, in east-central Poland. The first mention of the village dates back to 1866. During the years 1975-1998 the town administratively belonged to the province of Warsaw.

References

Jatne